John Colin Foster (born 19 September 1973) is an English football manager and former professional footballer who played as a defender.

Career
Foster began his career with Manchester City, playing several season in the Premier League. He later played in the Football League for Carlisle United and Bury before turning out at non-league level with Hyde United, Mossley, Trafford, Radcliffe Borough and Salford City. He spent a brief spell in charge of Salford in 2005.

References

Since 1888... The Searchable Premiership and Football League Player Database (subscription required)
Mossley Player A-Z

1973 births
Living people
English footballers
Association football defenders
Premier League players
Manchester City F.C. players
Carlisle United F.C. players
Bury F.C. players
Hyde United F.C. players
Salford City F.C. managers
English football managers
Mossley A.F.C. players
Trafford F.C. players
Radcliffe F.C. players
Salford City F.C. players